Bath is maudlin of the Well's second album. It was released alongside its companion album Leaving Your Body Map in 2001 on the Dark Symphonies record label, shortly before their break-up.

Background
Bath and its sister album are a combination of older demo material written as far back as 1997 in rearranged and re-orchestrated forms and new material, all recorded simultaneously to achieve consistency; to this end, the opening of "Girl With a Watering Can" re-orchestrates the first melody of "The Blue Ghost/Shedding Qliphoth," and the series of instrumental interludes sequenced in order of appearance across both albums. The melody of the fourth (and final) interlude purportedly came from a lucid dream, fulfilling a stated objective of the project. Each album features cover art befitting the title of its counterpart, with Bath featuring a map to a bath tub and window in yellow, and Leaving Your Body Map featuring the tub and window in red. The band inserted clues to a hidden secret in the liner notes of the albums through a series of complex symbols; to aid listeners, they recorded and released "The Secret Song" on an MCD in 2001, with lyrics purported to explain how to unlock the hidden message. It remains unsolved.

Both albums were reissued on Dark Symphonies with bonus tracks in 2005-2006. Blood Music reissued them again in 2012 for the first time on vinyl, including a box set for the companion albums, and later a CD box set of the band's discography.

Track listing

Personnel
Jason Byron - vocals, keyboards  
Toby Driver - vocals, guitars, bass
Maria-Stella Fountoulakis - vocals  
Greg Massi - vocals, guitars
Josh Seipp-Williams - guitars  
Jason Bitner - trumpet
Terran Olson - vocals, clarinet, flute
Sam Gutterman - drums, vocals

External links
Official Site of Dark Symphonies
KayoDot.net
Metal Archives page

References

2001 albums
Maudlin of the Well albums